LKS Szubinianka Szubin is a football club from Szubin, Poland, founded in 1959. Its highest ever position was reaching the Fourth Division in 2000. Its colours are blue and white.

External links
 Official website
90minut.pl profile
Unofficial website

Association football clubs established in 1959
1959 establishments in Poland
Nakło County
Football clubs in Kuyavian-Pomeranian Voivodeship